Iza is a town and municipality in Boyacá Department, Colombia. Iza is located near the Tota Lake and part of the Sugamuxi Province, a subregion of Boyacá. The municipality borders Firavitoba and Sogamoso in the north, Sogamoso and Cuítiva in the east, in the west Pesca and Firavitoba, and in the south Cuítiva.

History 
Before the Spanish conquest, the area of Iza was inhabited first by indigenous groups during the Herrera Period and later by the Muisca, organized in the Muisca Confederation. Iza was ruled by the iraca of Sugamuxi, modern neighbouring Sogamoso. According to Muisca mythology, the messenger god Bochica is said to have lived outside Iza in a cave.

In the Chibcha language of the Muisca za means "night", and Iza means "place of healing".

Modern Iza was founded on January 2, 1554. The town is nicknamed Nido Verde de Boyacá; "Green Nest of Boyacá".

Economy 
Main economical activities of Iza are mining (coal and pozzolan) and agriculture.

Born in Iza 
 Jairo Pérez, former professional cyclist

Gallery

References 

Municipalities of Boyacá Department
Populated places established in 1556
1556 establishments in the Spanish Empire
Muisca Confederation
Muysccubun